George Tooth (1869 – after 1899) was an English footballer who played in the Football League for Stoke.

Career
Tooth was born in Stoke-upon-Trent and played for Congleton Hornets before joining Stoke in 1898. He played five matches for Stoke scoring once against Everton in April 1899. He later went on to play for Stafford Rangers.

Career statistics

References

19th-century births
Year of death missing
Footballers from Stoke-on-Trent
Association football outside forwards
English footballers
Congleton Hornets F.C. players
Stoke City F.C. players
Stafford Rangers F.C. players
English Football League players